Adrian Roy Turner (born 21 January 1977) is a British former male Olympic swimmer, known for winning silver and bronze medals representing England at the 2002 Commonwealth Games and reaching the semi-final of the Athens 2004 Games.

Swimming career
Turner represented Great Britain on numerous occasions during his swimming career principally the 2004 Athens Olympic Games where he swam both individual medley events and reached the semi-final stage of the 200m.

Previously Turner had competed at two Commonwealth Games; he represented England in the individual medley events, at the 1998 Commonwealth Games in Kuala Lumpur, Malaysia.

Four years later at the 2002 Commonwealth Games in Manchester, he represented England in the 200m individual medley finishing in silver medal position in a time of 2:02.10 and the 400m individual medley finishing with bronze in 4:18.75.

Personal life
After retiring from international swimming Turner joined up with Olympic teammate Stephen Parry to found Total Swimming Ltd. The vision of the company is "Revolutionizing Swimming, Changing Lives."

Following the 2004 Athens Olympic Games Turner attended the Universita` per Stranieri di Perugia in Italy, where he studied a post-graduate course in the history of Italian theatre from 2004–2005. He is fluent in Italian. Following this he attended the Royal Academy of Dramatic Art (RADA) in London, completing a Masters in Text and Performance from 2005–2006. In 2010 he joined the cast of BBC drama The Cut in a recurring role as Coach Reynolds. In the same year he was cast in the lead role in Nice Shirt Films' international Vicks Sinex ad-campaign. From 2010 to 2012 he played Championship footballer Danny Deans in Big Balls Films/WeRInteractive's video-game 'I Am Playr' which was nominated for a BAFTA in 2012 and won the Cannes Golden Lion Award the same year.

He is the brother of TV presenter Beverley Turner and previously 
brother-in-law of Olympic rower James Cracknell.

See also
 List of Commonwealth Games medallists in swimming (men)

References

External links
 

1977 births
Alumni of RADA
English male swimmers
Olympic swimmers of Great Britain
Swimmers at the 2004 Summer Olympics
Swimmers at the 1998 Commonwealth Games
Swimmers at the 2002 Commonwealth Games
Commonwealth Games silver medallists for England
Commonwealth Games bronze medallists for England
Commonwealth Games medallists in swimming
Alumni of the University of Manchester
Living people
English male television actors
English male video game actors
Medallists at the 2002 Commonwealth Games